"The Chill of an Early Fall" is a song written by Green Daniel and Gretchen Peters and recorded by American country music artist George Strait. It was released in September 1991 as the third single from his album Chill of an Early Fall. The song reached number 3 on the Billboard Hot Country Singles & Tracks chart in December 1991. Joe Barnhill previously recorded the song on his 1990 self-titled debut album.

Content
The narrator is a man who knows that his lover has been with a guy before or perhaps cheated in the past. He feels the chill of an early fall when he thinks about it and when her "old friend" comes around. The question of whether the other man is just a friend or more torments the narrator and drives him to drink.

Chart performance
"The Chill of an Early Fall" debuted at number 57 on the U.S. Billboard Hot Country Singles & Tracks for the week of October 5, 1991.

Year-end charts

References

Songs about infidelity
1991 singles
George Strait songs
Songs written by Gretchen Peters
Song recordings produced by Jimmy Bowen
MCA Records singles
1990 songs